Kanice may refer to the following places:
Kanice, Lower Silesian Voivodeship (south-west Poland)
Kanice, Łódź Voivodeship (central Poland)
Kanice, West Pomeranian Voivodeship (north-west Poland)
Kanice (Brno-Country District), a municipality in the Czech Republic
Kanice (Domažlice District), a municipality in the Czech Republic